The Royal Residence is a royal villa located in Siem Reap, Cambodia. It serves as the official residence for the King of Cambodia for when he visits Siem Reap.

History 
According to Siem Reap’s provincial information department, the villa was constructed in 1904.

During the French protectorate period, it became an important site for former King Norodom Sihanouk, who was said to have used the residence to plan and launch his bid for Cambodia’s independence from France in the 1950s.

In the 1990s, the villa was used by King Sihanouk to host various political figures, primarily for peace talks, amid Cambodia’s political developments, including meetings with Prime Minister Hun Sen, Prince Norodom Ranariddh, opposition politician Sam Rainsy and foreign diplomats.    

On 18 February 2017, King Norodom Sihamoni hosted actress Angelina Jolie and her family at the residence. Jolie was in Siem Reap at the time for the world premiere of First They Killed My Father of which she served as the director and Sihamoni as a film patron.

On the night of 12 March 2023, a major fire broke out due to an apparent electrical fault, which damaged parts of the royal residence complex, specifically the adjacent building which serves as the office quarters of the King, though the main residential building was not affected. Officials have pledged to rebuild the structure with works having already commenced.

The Royal Residence today 
Apart from being the official secondary royal residence for the Cambodian monarch, the villa is a frequented local site and tourist attraction in Siem Reap city, although direct entry is not permitted by members of the public. However, it can be viewed from the exterior and the adjoining Royal Independence Gardens are publicly accessible, alongside the nearby King Master Statue and Preah Ang Chek Preah Ang Chorm shrine which are both locally revered and religiously significant.

References

Royal residences in Cambodia
Palaces in Cambodia
Official residences in Cambodia
Buildings and structures in Siem Reap
Tourist attractions in Siem Reap province